The List of shipwrecks in 1775 includes some ships sunk, wrecked or otherwise lost during 1775.

January

11 January

20 January

21 January

25 January

26 January

30 January

Unknown date

February

3 February

4 February

15 February

Unknown date

March

4 March

11 March

19 March

29 March

Unknown date

April

3 April

6 April

25 April

Unknown date

May

18 May

Unknown date

June

11 June

16 June

Unknown date

July

2 July

31 July

Unknown date

August

10 August

21 August

25 August

28 August

Unknown date

September

2 September

4 September

5 September

11 September

12 September

27 September

Unknown date

October

10 October

13 October

16 October

17 October

19 October

20 October

Unknown date

November

1 November

3 November

4 November

5 November

10 November

11 November

12 November

13 November

16 November

17 November

Unknown date

December

3 December

5 December

23 December

Unknown date

Unknown date

References

1775